The 2006 Danish Figure Skating Championships was held from December 3 through 4, 2005. Skaters competed in the disciplines of men's singles and ladies' singles. Not all disciplines were held on all levels due to a lack of participants.

Senior results

Men

Ladies

External links
 results

Danish Figure Skating Championships
2005 in figure skating
Danish Figure Skating Championships, 2006
Figure Skating Championships